Athletics is one of the regular sports at the biennial Southeast Asian Games (SEA Games) competition, which has been competed at the Games since the inaugural edition of the South East Asian Peninsular Games (SEAP) in 1959.

Athletics is the competition with the most medal events, with 48 of total 530 gold medal in 2019 edition.

Editions

South East Asian Peninsular Games

Southeast Asian Games

See also
List of Southeast Asian Games records in athletics
List of Southeast Asian Games gold medalists in athletics

External links
Past SEA athletics medallists 1959–2005 from GBR Athletics

 
Southeast Asian Games
Southeast Asian Games